The 13th Guldbagge Awards ceremony, presented by the Swedish Film Institute, honored the best Swedish films of 1976 and 1977, and took place on 5 September 1977. The Man on the Roof directed by Bo Widerberg was presented with the award for Best Film.

Awards
 Best Film: The Man on the Roof by Bo Widerberg
 Best Director: Marianne Ahrne for Near and Far Away
 Best Actor: Håkan Serner for The Man on the Roof and Bang!
 Best Actress: Birgitta Valberg for Paradise Place
 Special Achievement: Sven Klang's Combo

References

External links
Official website
Guldbaggen on Facebook
Guldbaggen on Twitter
13th Guldbagge Awards at Internet Movie Database

1977 in Sweden
1977 film awards
Guldbagge Awards ceremonies
September 1977 events in Europe
1970s in Stockholm